Dark Knights of Steel is an American comic book created by Tom Taylor and Yasmine Putri and published by DC Comics. The twelve-issue limited series—written by Taylor and illustrated primarily by Putri—began its monthly publication on November 2, 2021. Set in an alternate universe, the series is a high fantasy reimagining of the DC Universe starring Superman and Batman.

Publication 
The Dark Knights of Steel comic book limited series was created by Tom Taylor and Yasmine Putri, with the former serving as writer and the latter as lead illustrator; the fourth and seventh issues of the comic book were drawn by Bengal and Nathan Gooden rather than Putri. Dark Knights of Steel consists of twelve issues released by DC Comics at monthly intervals, the first being published on November 2, 2021. A special issue, Tales from the Three Kingdoms, featuring three stories set in the Dark Knights of Steel world prior to the main plot, was released on September 6, 2022, written by Taylor, Jay Kristoff and C.S. Pacat.

Issues

Specials

Plot

Main plot
Fleeing the destruction of Krypton, Jor-El and Lara crash-land on Earth and are confronted by a group of archers who arrive to investigate from a nearby castle. Jor-El destroys them with his heat vision just as his son, Kal-El is born. In the nearby Kingdom of Storms, a local peasant boy named Constantine has a vision of demons who will conquer the world while King Jefferson listens and orders the prophecy recorded.

Nineteen years later, Bruce, a knight of the Kingdom of El, his companion Alfred, and his squires Richard, Duke, Jason and Stephanie go on a quest to capture a banshee. Prince Kal-el asks to join them but is forbidden, due to his family's vulerability to magic. The party locate the banshee and Bruce accuses her of being an assassin sent by King Jefferson, based on knowledge he has gained from his spy in Jefferson's court. The banshee denies this and attacks, with her scream destroying the building they are in but leaving Bruce largely unharmed. She is then apprehended by Bruce and Kal-el and is taken back to the castle, where she is imprisoned in the dungeon along with other magical beings. Jor-El and Lara, now King and Queen, summon them to the throne room where Kal-el admits that he followed Bruce without his knowledge and questions why ordinary men should act on their behalf when he is invincible. Jor-El talks to Bruce on the battlements and Bruce explains that he thinks he is cursed after being able to survive the banshee's scream and should be exiled or imprisoned. Jor-El reveals to Bruce that he is his father and that when Bruce's mother, Queen Martha and her husband Thomas died, the Els took over as they knew the people would never accept Bruce as a bastard King. In a nearby forest, the Green Man enchants the arrow of Oliver, an outlaw, and it successfully kills Jor-El by piercing him in the eye.

While Lara and Kal-El grieve, Bruce, his powers seemingly activated by his anger, mounts his horse, finds Oliver in the forest and cuts off one of his arms. Alfred convinces Bruce not to kill him and they bring Oliver back to the castle for questioning. The Green Man visits King Jefferson and Constantine, now his advisor, in the Kingdom of Storms and informs them that Jor-El is dead. Constantine is unnerved, beginning to doubt his own prophecy and warning Jefferson that he has angered the Kingdom of El. General Waller calls for war against the Kingdom of Storms but royal jester and advisor Harley and Alfred counsel against this. Kal-El blames Bruce for failing to protect his father and confronts Oliver in the dungeon, though is determined to prove that his family are not the killers they have been made out to be. On the nearby island of Amazonia, Queen Hippolyta's advisor Lois Lane informs her of Jor-El's death. She goes to the sparring field to inform Jor-Els daughter Zala and her lover Diana. Zala flies off enraged, with Lois and Diana fearing that the war they have been trying to prevent is now inevitable. Zala goes to the Pierce's castle and murders Jefferson's son, Jacob in front of him.

Master Olsen sees a falling star and Bruce and Alfred are sent to investigate by Lara, as it may signify the beginning of the prophecy. The Metal Men arrive at the impact site first but are killed by Zala. King Jefferson and Constantine travel to Amazonia, where they meet with Queen Hippolyta, Diana, Lois and General Philippus and inform them of Jacob's death. He admits that he had Jor-El killed and stated that Zala was responsible for murdering his son, which Diana refuses to believe. Despite this, Hippolyta promises that, should the Kingdom of Storms go to war with the Els, she will support him, causing a disgusted Diana to leave. As Jefferson sails home, he reveals that having Diana removed from the Amazon court was a part of his plan due to her loyalty to the El family. Zala then attacks the ship and murders Jefferson who, in his dying moments, tells Constantine that Anissa is now Queen. Meanwhile, Bruce finds the kryptonite and it makes him weak. He confesses to Alfred that Jor-El was his father and Alfred tells him he already knows.

Alfred explains to Bruce that, when the Els originally arrived on Earth, they hid so that their alien nature would not be revealed but that, when a nearby volcano threatened to destroy  the kingdom, they devised a way to prevent it and gave these plans to Luthor, King Thomas and Queen Martha's advisor, who disregarded them. The Els were subsequently forced to expose themselves to save the kingdom and became lifelong friends of the King and Queen. Though their respective relationships are strained when Jor-El and Martha sleep together, Bruce's birth brings the families back together again. Luthor, stripped of his titles and exiled, finds a magical ring, which manipulates him into the Joker, and he attacks the royal carriages, killing Thomas and Martha. Lara is told by Martha that she and Jo-El must rule the kingdom until Bruce becomes of age and the people are ready to accept a bastard King. Alfred then tells Bruce that they must avoid war with the Kingdom of Storms at any cost.

On the orders of Queen Lara, Harley goes to the Lady of the Forest and asks that she help defend the kingdom. Though critical of the El family, the Lady relents and says that she would do anything for Harley. She then apprehends Diana, who reveals that she needs to talk to Zala, who then arrives with Kal. Diana tells Zala that she has been accused of murdering Prince Jacob, which she denies, and explains that the Amazons will stand with the Kingdom of Storms in the war. Bruce and Alfred return to the castle and Bruce confesses the truth of his parentage to Kal-El. Kal then takes the kryptonite and stabs Bruce with it, claiming there can be no challengers to his family's rule. Bruce is later found, barely alive, by two peasants, Jonathan and Martha Kent, and is taken to their home.

At the Pierce's castle, Constantine uses alcohol to numb the death of King Jefferson, whom he loved. His assistant, Timothy tries to comfort him and Constantine states that he knows he is a spy for Bruce and that he deliberately fed him misinformation. Timothy questions why Constantine told him about the magical assassin and works out that, while he believes in his prophecy that the Els are dangerous, he does not want to start a war. Constantine attacks Timothy and exposes him to Princess Jennifer, though convinces her not to kill him. Jennifer tells Timothy to leave and warns him that war is coming. Timothy reports to the court and states that Jefferson was murdered by Zala, who denies this. When everyone is gone, General Waller tells Lara that, if Hippolyta were to die, Diana would become Queen of the Amazons and that her love for Zala would prevent the Amazon army from siding with the Kingdom of Storms. Constantine summons the demon Etrigan and asks to speak to his human host Ra's al Ghul in the hope that he can resurrect Jefferson. Ra's explains that the body is too damaged but that he will revive Prince Jacob in exchange for information on the Titans. Kal-El flies to Amazonia to try and clear his sister's name and prevent war but Hippolyta stabs him with a magical sword and imprisons him. Lois comes to his cell and tells him that, while she has always defended the Els, the Queen no longer listens to her and that the Amazon ships have already set sail.

Ra's brings the resurrects Prince Jacob to Constantine but they state that he cannot go home as he will be burned as an abomination. At the Kent farm, Bruce is plagues by nightmares of the El family destroying the world. Raven, one of the children being harbored by the Kents, uses her magic to remove the last of the kryptonite from Bruce's bloodstream, saving his life. Raven and her fellow Titans, Beast Boy, Victor and Kory state that they initially considered letting him die because of what he has done to people like them. Jonathan and Martha tell Bruce that they understand why he hates magic after what happened to his parents but that he must learn that not everyone who is different is dangerous. Ra's, his daughter and the League of Shades arrive to claim the Titans but they are fought off by Bruce, the Kents and the Titans. Richard tracks Bruce to the farm and tells him of King Jefferson's death, though Bruce refuses to return to the castle. Jonathan tells him that he has the power to prevent the war and must go back.

Queen Hippolyta pledges her unconditional support to Queen Anissa and Princess Jennifer. Lois tells Constantine that she feels as though the kingdoms are being manipulated and that Zala's actions to do match with the girl that she knows, though a vengeful Constantine does not listen. In the dungeons of Castle El, Oliver frees the banshee, Dinah, and promises to teach her to control her scream so they can escape. Luthor, the Green Man, watches the Kingdom of Storms and the Amazon army advance on the Els land. Harley and General Waller meet them at the entrance of the forest and attempt to negotiate a peaceful solution, though Hippolyta and Anissa state they will only stand down if the Els surrender. Constantine attempts to attack the emissaries but is prevented by the Lady of the Forest, who covers their escape. Luthor's ring tells him to intervene and he knocks her unconscious, telling the armies to take the castle. Lara reluctantly orders her soldiers to prepare for battle when a final attempt to avert the war by Diana and Zala fails. At Constantine's order, Prince Jacob uses his powers to fill Zala's lungs with water, though she is saved from death by Lara, who arrives on the battlefield and cuts Hippolyta in half with her heat vision.

Cassandra, Bruce's spy in the Amazonian court, frees Kal-El and gives him the Lasso of Truth to help stop the war. When he reaches the armies, a fleeing Lara knocks him out of the sky and, believing he is attacking them, a grief-stricken Diana orders the Amazons to kill him. Both armies begin to fight, while Luthor attacks both sides indiscriminately. Bruce arrives, using Beast Boy's dragon fire to halt both armies and confronts Kal-El, who is confused about Bruce's accusations against him. Lois is able to convince Constantine that they are being manipulated, as Lara's assassination of Hippolyta makes no sense. Lara enters the castle dungeon and begins killing the prisoners, though Dinah and Oliver are able to escape. She pursues them across the battlefield but is tackled by another Lara, causing the armies to stop fighting. Based on advice from Alfred, Oliver fires a flaming crossbow bolt into Lara's chest, revealing that she is a white-skinned monster, who uses her invisibility to flee. Alfred apologises to Bruce, stating he didn't know "they" were on Earth and transforms into a green-skinned alien.

Tales from the Three Kingdoms

Arkham Orphanage
Escaping from Arkham Orphange by being adopted by Perry White and his wife, young Jimmy Olsen develops an interest in astronomy and builds a friendship with Prince Kal-El. When Jimmy and several orphans go missing, Kal decides to look for them himself and reluctantly allows Bruce and Zala to accompany him. The three royals speak with two of the remaining orphans, Oswald and Harvey, who tell them that a winged creature took their friend Waylon and carried him into the mountains. They locate the creature and engage it in battle but are stopped by Jimmy, who reveals that it is his friend Kirk, who had taken the orphans in order to protect them from the experiments that were being performed on them by the orphanage's owner Elizabeth Arkham. Lara and Jor-El send General Waller to shut down the orphanage and take Elizabeth into custody, though Waller secretly recruits Elizabeth to work for her.

The Flock
In order to learn more about his people, Harley plans to take Prince Kal-El into the town during All Hallows Eve but are caught by Bruce, who warns of lawlessness in the city and goes with them, much to Harley's chagrin. A gang of street urchins known as the Robins steal Harley's necklace and scatter as the princes give chase. Bruce follows Richard, the ringleader, and is impressed with his acrobatic abilities and is able to capture him when he stops to save a small boy from being hit by a carriage, while Kal rounds up the others. Bruce warns that pickpockets eventually become bandits and killers but the Robins deny this, stating that they only steal from those who can afford it and only in order to survive and protect others. Instead of imprisoning them, Bruce recruits them as his protegees.

King's Bane
A young Bruce and his guards are attacked in the forest by a masked outlaw known as The King's Bane who then kneels before Bruce and hails him as the true King, claiming that the Els are monsters who have no right to the throne. Bane offers to teach Bruce how to kill a monster and invites him to a meeting of Wayne loyalists at a nearby inn. Bane begins training Bruce and teaches him how to use stealth and surprise in order to fight those he cannot match in strength and confesses that he was a former guard of the Waynes and was there when the Green Man killed them. He was crippled in the attack and was saved by a doctor who used dark magic to keep him alive, which Bane reluctantly accepts. Though he was unable to save the King and Queen, Bane vows to honor their memory by ensuring their heir takes the throne. Bruce smuggles Bane into the castle but double-crosses Bane, who planned to murder the Els with a magical mace, and throws him into the dungeon before pledging his loyalty to Lara and Jor-El.

Collected editions

Reception 
Reviewing the first issue of Dark Knights of Steel, Henry Varona of Comic Book Resources stated, "Dark Knights of Steel #1 is an appropriately epic beginning to DC's latest Elseworlds epic. Tom Taylor proves yet again that he is a master of subverting expectations when crafting alternate DC Universes, while the gorgeous artwork of Yasmine Putri turns the concept into a fully realized fantasy".

See also 
 Marvel 1602, a comic book series by Marvel Comics with a similar premise.

References 

2021 comics debuts
American comics
Comics about revenge
Comics publications
DC Comics dimensions
DC Comics limited series
DC Comics titles
Elseworlds titles
Fantasy comics
Superhero comics